Franklin High School is a 3A public high school located in Franklin, Texas (USA). It is part of the Franklin Independent School District located in central Robertson County.  In 2011, the school was rated "Academically Acceptable" by the Texas Education Agency.

Athletics
The Franklin Lions compete in the following sports:

Football, Volleyball, Basketball, Cross Country, Powerlifting, Golf, Tennis, Track, Baseball, and Softball.

State titles
Football
2021(3A/D2)
2022(3A/D1)
Franklin defeated north Texas football power Gunter in the 2021 UIL Conference 3A Division II Championship Game on the way to its first football state championship.

In 2022 Franklin won their 2nd consecutive state championship by defeating Brock in the UIL Division I Championship Game.

Fine arts
The Franklin High School has a variety of Fine Arts that range from:

Marching, Concert, Jazz Band, Art, and Theatre.

References

External links
Franklin ISD

Schools in Robertson County, Texas
Public high schools in Texas